Kuchak Komsar or Kuchek Komsar may refer to:
 Kuchak Komsar, Fuman
 Kuchak Komsar, Shaft